Catherine Louise Machado (born April 20, 1936 in Santa Monica, California) is an American former figure skater. She is a two-time U.S. national bronze medalist. In 1956, Machado became the first Latina to represent the United States at a Winter Olympics. After the 1956 World Championships, she turned professional. She was inducted into the United States Figure Skating Hall of Fame in 2005.

Results

References

American female single skaters
Figure skaters at the 1956 Winter Olympics
Olympic figure skaters of the United States
Sportspeople from Santa Monica, California
1936 births
Living people
21st-century American women